Mato Grande is a settlement in the island of Brava, Cape Verde. It is situated in the mountains, 1 km southeast of the island capital Nova Sintra.

References

Villages and settlements in Brava, Cape Verde